Thitarodes dongyuensis is a species of moth of the family Hepialidae. It was described by Liang in 1992, and is known from China.

References

External links
Hepialidae genera

Moths described in 1992
Hepialidae